Pletholax edelensis, the Edel land slider, is a species of lizard in the family Pygopodidae.

Geographic range
Pletholax edelensis is endemic to coastal areas of western Australia.

References

Legless lizards
Pletholax
Reptiles described in 1978
Taxa named by Glen Milton Storr
Pygopodids of Australia